The Osmonds is a 1972 ABC-TV Saturday morning cartoon series produced by Rankin/Bass Productions starring the Osmond Brothers. Each episode features the family in a different location around the world, with young Jimmy's antics usually driving the plot of the episode. As with most television series oriented around bands, the Osmonds' songs were featured prominently in the series. The series also featured their talking pet dog, Fuji. Marie Osmond did not appear in the series (save for being briefly depicted in "Transylvania,") as she would not make her performing debut until 1973.  An abridged version of their hit song "One Bad Apple" was used for the opening and closing credits of the show.

Like The Jackson 5ive, it used a laugh track created by Rankin/Bass.  Unlike the Jacksons, the Osmond brothers provided their own speaking voices in their series.

Episodes
Each episode features one song by the Osmonds as a group and one solo song by either Donny or Jimmy.  Songs are followed by their album inclusions. Most of the Osmonds group songs came from their rock-era albums Phase III and Crazy Horses.

References

External links
 
 

1970s American animated television series
1970s American musical comedy television series
American children's animated comedy television series
American children's animated musical television series
American Broadcasting Company original programming
1972 American television series debuts
1972 American television series endings
Topcraft
Animation based on real people
Television series based on singers and musicians
Rankin/Bass Productions television series
Television series by Universal Television
Television series by Halas and Batchelor